This is discography for rapper Twista.

Albums

Studio albums

Collaboration albums

Compilation albums

Mixtapes

Extended plays

Singles

As lead artist

Other charted songs

As featured performer

Guest appearances

Notes

References

 
Hip hop discographies
Discographies of American artists